John Gallant is a lacrosse player and captain of the Colorado Mammoth in the National Lacrosse League.

Before signing on with the Colorado Mammoth, Gallant played for the Washington Power for one season. He was voted to the 2007 All-star game as a reserve defenseman and helped Team Canada defend their title at the 2007 World Indoor Lacrosse Championships in Halifax Nova Scotia, Canada.

Gallant is the only remaining player on the Colorado Mammoth to have played with the club for each of its seven seasons, and he was announced as team captain on November 16, 2009, succeeding the team's all time leading scorer, Gavin Prout.

Statistics

NLL

External links
 Player Bio Page

References

   Mammoth Names 2010 Captains.

1978 births
Canadian expatriate lacrosse people in the United States
Canadian lacrosse players
Colorado Mammoth players
Lacrosse defenders
Lacrosse people from Ontario
Living people
National Lacrosse League All-Stars
Sportspeople from Brantford